Trélod is a mountain of Savoie and Haute-Savoie in France. It lies in the Bauges range of the French Prealps and has an elevation of 2,181 metres above sea level.

References

Mountains of Savoie
Mountains of Haute-Savoie
Mountains of the Alps